Crematogaster corvina is a species of ant in tribe Crematogastrini. It was described by Mayr in 1870.

References

corvina
Insects described in 1870